Alba Pomares López (born 29 August 1995) is a Spanish football forward currently playing for Fundación Albacete.

Club career
Pomares missed just under a year of football after injuring her anterior cruciate ligament in a match against Fundación Albacete while playing for Espanyol. After playing seven seasons at Espanyol, she left the Catalan club and signed with Fundación Albacete in 2017. In her first season at Albacete, she, again, injured her anterior cruciate ligament, this time against Levante, and faced another lengthy absence.

International career
Pomares scored the only goal in extra time of the final of the 2011 U-17 European Championship against France to give the Spanish U-17 national team its second European Championship title in a row. Following the match, her teammates all signed the ball, which she kept as a souvenir. She also received a congratulatory phone call from Spain international Verónica Boquete.

References

1995 births
Living people
Spanish women's footballers
Women's association football forwards
Primera División (women) players
RCD Espanyol Femenino players
Fundación Albacete players
Spain women's youth international footballers